Lagocheirus mecotrochanter is a species of longhorn beetles of the subfamily Lamiinae. It was described by Toledo in 1998, and is known from Mexico.

References

Beetles described in 1998
Endemic insects of Mexico
Lagocheirus